Higham is a village and civil parish in Suffolk, England. In 2005 it had a population of 140, including Shelley and increasing to 203 at the census  2011.

The village itself is a designated conservation area, whilst the entire parish is located within the Dedham Vale Area of Outstanding Natural Beauty. It also contains Rowley Grove, a nature reserve classed as Ancient Woodland and a point to point racecourse which is home to the Waveney Harriers.

St Mary's Church
A church stood in Higham at the time of the Domesday Book and parts of the original church are incorporated into the current building, which is primarily 14th to 15th-century. The north aisle was added in 1410 and is thought to be the work of 'Hawes', a mason from Occold, who was responsible for similar work on the chancel arches at the churches at Bildeston, Debenham and Otley.

At the west end of the nave is a Perpendicular font and nearby is a large stoup of a similar age. The benches are Victorian copies of medieval originals, although four 15th-century poppyheads have been re-used. The timber-framed chancel arch is also Victorian and is decorated with delicate carvings of flowers and foliage. The chancel stalls, also Victorian, have traceried fronts.

The medieval piscina is set beneath a 15th-century moulded arch. Above the piscina, on the south wall; is a memorial to Alice Dokenfield who died in 1622 at the age of 15. The oldest memorial, uncovered during repairs to the floor in 2005, is a slab, with indents for brasses, probably that of John Mannock of Giffords Hall in Shimpling who died in 1476. According to the church guide the missing brasses were removed by William Dowsing, who visited Higham on 2 February 1644. The timber roof beams have carved wooden corbels with various facial expressions.

The emotive monument to Robert Hoy (d.1811) is by the London sculptor, Charles Regnart.

Higham Hall

Higham Hall is a Grade II listed building situated next to St Mary's Church. It dates from the early 19th century with a 17th-century or earlier rear range altered in the 19th century. The front range is of white brick, partly pebble-dashed at the rear. The rear range is of red brick in English bond, with an inner face pebble-dashed, and an outer wall rendered. The roof is of slate. The front range is of two storeys and an attic. It has five bays with a slightly lower rear range to the right, forming an L-plan. The entrance and window bays are set in a two-storey arcade with impost bands leading to segment arches of gauged brick. There is a central Doric porch. The sash windows have glazing bars in reveals with sills under cambered gauged brick arches. The centre three bays have a pediment. There is an overhanging hipped roof with wooden bracketed eaves. There are a pair of dormers with sashes.

The front garden has a notable giant redwood tree/

Cedric Morris

Early in 1929 artist Cedric Morris and his companion took the lease of Pound Farm in the village and in February 1930 they gave up the London studio. In 1932 the owner of Pound Farm, who was for a while a student, died and left it to Morris. There were many visitors at Pound Farm, including Frances Hodgkins, Barbara Hepworth and John Skeaping. Joan Warburton, who was a student described Pound Farm as "a paradise", mainly because of the spectacular gardens which Morris developed. She was also impressed by their spectacular parties.

References

External links

Higham racecourse Point-to-point East Anglia

 
Villages in Suffolk
Civil parishes in Suffolk
Babergh District